The Spectator was an English-language newspaper published from Madras between 1836 and 1859. It is the first daily newspaper to be published from the city.

History 

The Spectator was founded as a weekly in 1836 with J. Ouchterlony as its first publisher. After him, the newspaper was published by C. Sooboo Moodely and C. M. Pereira.  The Spectator became a daily newspaper in 1850; it is the first daily English newspaper to be published from Madras. The newspaper was purchased by Gantz and Sons and merged with The Madras Times in 1859.

References 

  

English-language newspapers published in India
Defunct newspapers published in India
Mass media in Chennai
Publications established in 1836
Publications disestablished in 1859
1836 establishments in British India
1859 disestablishments in British India